Nothing to Declare UK (known as Customs UK for Series 1) was a British reality TV series shown from 2008 onwards.
It is filmed at Gatwick and Bristol airports, and occasionally shows the work of customs and immigration officials at the Port of Dover, alongside at the airports for the other parts of the time.

All episodes were narrated by Jon Rand.

See also 
 UK Border Force

References

2011 British television series debuts
British reality television series
Documentary television series about aviation
Sky UK original programming
Television series about border control